Invasor may refer to:

 Invasor (film), a 2012 Spanish-French action thriller
Invasor (newspaper), a Cuban newspaper
Invasor (horse), an Argentine racehorse

See also 
 Invader (disambiguation)